This article lists the deadliest aircraft accidents and incidents involving commercial passenger and cargo flights, military passenger and cargo flights, or general-aviation flights that have been involved in a ground or midair collision.

History
In 1908, five years after the pioneering flight of the Wright brothers on 17 December 1903, Thomas Selfridge became the first fatality of powered flight while flying as a passenger with Orville Wright during a demonstration of the Wright Model A at Fort Myer, Virginia, on 17 September 1908. In 1909, Eugène Lefebvre was the first to be killed while piloting a powered airplane, while the first fatal midair collision occurred on 19 June 1912, near Douai, France, killing the pilot of each aircraft. Since the deaths of these early aviation pioneers, the scale of fatal aircraft accidents has increased in proportion to the size and capacity of airplanes.

The greatest number of fatalities involving one airline in one year occurred in 2014, when 537 people died (presumably - with the wreckage unrecovered, the death toll is not entirely confirmed) in the disappearance of Malaysia Airlines MH370 and the crash of Malaysia Airlines Flight MH17 four months later. The most fatalities in any aviation accident in history occurred during 1977 in the Tenerife airport disaster, when 583 people were killed when two Boeing 747s collided on a runway. The greatest number of fatalities from a midair collision occurred at the Charkhi Dadri midair collision, to the west of New Delhi, India, on 12 November 1996 when a Saudi Arabian Airlines Boeing 747-100B en route from Delhi to Dhahran, Saudi Arabia, collided with Kazakhstan Airlines Ilyushin Il-76 en route from Chimkent, Kazakhstan, to Delhi, killing all 349 people aboard both the airplanes. The September 11 attacks on the World Trade Center claimed not only 157 passengers and crew but an additional 2,606 victims. 

In 2012, Boeing released a study of worldwide commercial jet airplane accidents between 1959 and 2011, reporting 1,798 accidents, 603 categorized as fatal, which accounted for 29,025 onboard fatalities and an additional 1,173 ground or noncommercial aircraft collision deaths. The Boeing analysis suggests a decrease of commercial aviation accident fatality rates toward the end of the study period.

Definitions
The US Code of Federal Regulations defines an accident as "an occurrence associated with the operation of an aircraft, which takes place between the time any person boards the aircraft with the intention of flight and all such persons have disembarked, and in which any person suffers death or serious injury, or in which the aircraft receives substantial damage;" an incident as "an occurrence other than an accident, associated with the operation of an aircraft, which affects or could affect the safety of operations;" and a fatal injury as one which results in death within 30 days of the accident. The definitions of accident, incident, and fatality in the Code of Federal Regulations, and used by the FAA and NTSB, are generally consistent with those found in the ICAO Chicago Convention on International Civil Aviation Annex 13.

Table key

Table

Notes regarding table data columns

Deaths
 Total (Tot): The total number of fatalities associated with the accident or incident.
 Crew (C): The number of crew fatalities.
 Passenger (P): The number of passenger fatalities.
 Ground (G): The number of ground (non-flying) fatalities.
 Notes (N): The presence of a cross (†) denotes that all passengers and crew were killed. The presence of a one with an asterisk (1*) indicates the accident or incident had a sole survivor.

Type
Occurrences have been coded to allow for identification and sorting by group membership (accidents and related incidents versus attacks).

Accidents and related incidents
 "COM": Commercial aircraft
 "MIL": Military aircraft
Any collision between a commercial and military aircraft is coded COM.

Attacks and related incidents
 "INB": Internal attack involving a pre-planned bomb (without hijacking).
 "INH": Internal attack to commandeer aircraft. The use of weapons (including a bomb or other explosives) for this purpose is coded in this category.
 "EXG": External attack originating on the ground (e.g., ground to air missiles, destruction of the aircraft while on the runway).
 "EXS": External attack originating in the sky (e.g., intentional downing by a military aircraft).

Location

To provide some indication of the distance between the site and the nearest location, the following three descriptors are applied:
 none: No descriptor appears before the location name. The site was within 20 km (12.5 mi) of the location.
 "off": Used only for those aquatic crash sites within 20 km (12.5 mi) of the location.
 "near": The site was approximately 20 km to 50 km (12.5 mi to 31 mi) from the location.
 "area of": The crash site was over 50 km (31 mi) from the location provided.
The names of occurrence locations are based on their present-day names.

Phases of flight
The phases of flight are those defined by the joint Commercial Aviation Safety
Team/ICAO Common Taxonomy Team.
 Standing (STD): Prior to pushback/taxi, after gate arrival, or stationary and parked.
 Taxi (TXI): Moving under own power, prior to takeoff or after landing.
 Take off (TOF): Initiation of takeoff power, pulling back on controls, through to 10 m (35 ft) altitude.
 Initial climb (ICL): End of TOF to the first of: initial prescribed power reduction, 300 m (1000 ft) altitude, or VFR pattern.
 En route (ENR): End of ICL, through descent, to initial approach (IFR) or 300 m (1000 ft) above runway elevation (VFR).
 Maneuvering (MNV): Only for low altitude flight (observation, photography) or aerobatics.
 Approach (APR): From IAF or 300 m (1000 ft) elevation to landing flare.
 Landing (LDG): Landing flare through to exit from runway.
 Unknown (UNK): Unable to determine phase of flight.

Airports and distance
Airports associated with occurrences at all phases of flight (except ENR) are represented by their three-letter IATA airport code. In some cases, no IATA code is reported/assigned in which case the four-letter ICAO code is used. In rare instances (e.g., active or decommissioned military bases or closed airports whose civil codes have been reassigned), no codes exist. These airports are represented with three asterisks "***" in place of letters. Distance from the point of impact to the airport runway is provided for occurrences during the initial climb (ICL) and approach (APR) phases. On occasion, distance is provided for occurrences during takeoff (TOF) and landing (LDG) if the aircraft impacted within the aerodrome, but not on the runway.

See also

 List of accidents and incidents involving airliners by airline
 List of accidents and incidents involving airliners by location
 List of accidents and incidents involving commercial aircraft

Notes
All accident and incident references to the Aviation Safety Network database are sub-pages of their main website, http://aviation-safety.net.

References

Books

Further reading
 
 
 

Aviation-related lists
Death-related lists
Lists by death toll
Lists of aviation accidents and incidents